NK Rudar may refer to:

NK Rudar, football club from Labin, Croatia.
NK Rudar, football club from Velenje, Slovenia.
NK Rudar, football club from Trbovlje, Slovenia.